Lampropteryx synthetica is a moth in the  family Geometridae. It is found in Taiwan.

The wingspan is 26–36 mm.

References

Cidariini
Endemic fauna of Taiwan
Moths described in 1922
Moths of Taiwan
Taxa named by Louis Beethoven Prout